Le maître de chapelle, ou Le souper imprévu (The Chapelmaster, or The Unexpected Supper) is an opéra comique in two acts by the Italian composer Ferdinando Paer. The French libretto, by Sophie Gay, is based on Le souper imprévu, ou Le chanoine de Milan by Alexandre Duval (1796).

Le maître de chapelle was premiered by the Opéra-Comique at the Théâtre Feydeau in Paris on 29 March 1821 with the famous baritone Jean-Blaise Martin as Barnabé. By 1900 the work had been performed by the Opéra-Comique over 430 times. It was given at the Royal Opera in London on 13 June 1845, and at the Théâtre d'Orléans, New Orleans on 21 November 1848.

It became Paer's most popular work, albeit usually performed in an abridged version of only the first act.

Roles

Synopsis
1797, near Milan. The chapelmaster Barnabé has composed an opera entitled Cléopâtre which he hopes will be staged in Milan, however he is worried that someone in the invading French army will take it away from him.

Recordings
Paer: Le maître de chapelle  - ORTF Chamber Orchestra 
Conductor: Jean-Paul Kreder
Principal singers: Jean-Christophe Benoît (Barnabé), Mady Mesplé (Coelénie), Isabel Garcisanz (Gertrude), Michel Sénéchal (Benetto), Pierre Pégaud (Firmin), Yves Bisson (Sans Quartier)
Recording date: 1970
Label: Black Disc - Inedits ORTF - 995 004 (LP)

See also
List of operas by Ferdinando Paer

References

Sources

Balthazar, Scott L  (1992), 'Maître de chapelle, Le' in The New Grove Dictionary of Opera, ed. Stanley Sadie (London) 
Warrack, John and West, Ewan (1992), The Oxford Dictionary of Opera, 782 pages,  

Operas by Ferdinando Paer
Opéras comiques
French-language operas
1821 operas
Operas
Opera world premieres at the Opéra-Comique
Operas set in Italy